Turóc (Hungarian, historically also spelled Túrócz), /comitatus Thurociensis) was an administrative county (comitatus) of the Kingdom of Hungary. Its territory is now in north-western Slovakia, where the corresponding Slovak name Turiec is only an informal designation of the corresponding territory.

Geography

Turóc county shared borders with the counties of Nyitra, Trencsén, Árva, Liptó, Zólyom and Bars, situated between the Lesser Fatra (Kis-Fátra) and Greater Fatra (Nagy-Fátra) Mountains. The river Turóc flowed through the county. Its area was 1123 km² around 1910.

Capitals
The capitals of the Turóc county were the Szklabinya Castle and Turócszentmárton (present-day Martin; Slovak name until 1950: Turčiansky Svätý Martin); from 1772 only Turócszentmárton was the capital.

History
Turóc county as a Hungarian comitatus arose in the 14th century. In the aftermath of World War I, the area of the now defunct Turóc county became part of newly formed Czechoslovakia, as recognized by the concerned states in 1920 by the Treaty of Trianon. The territory of the county is now part of Slovakia.

Demographics

Subdivisions

In the early 20th century, the subdivisions of Turóc county were:
Lower Turóc – its center was Turócszentmárton and the subregion roughly corresponds to the present-day District of Martin
Upper Turóc – its center was Stubnyafürdő and the subregion roughly corresponds to the present-day District of Turčianske Teplice

Governors

Michael Reway de Rewa, comes ( 1569).
Franciscus Revay ( 1638).
Andrea Czeromanka de Tarno.
Petrus de Reva, comes ( 1767).

Notes

References

Counties in the Kingdom of Hungary